Benjamin O. Jimerson-Phillips is an American movie producer, director, songwriter, and screenwriter. He was also known as Benjamin O. Jimerson. He was owner of Jimerson & Associates founded in 1995. He is a screenwriter, and has written five books.

Biography 

Jimerson-Philips is the son of Jessie Jimerson-Phillips and Bishop James Olgethorpe Patterson, Sr. He attended Sabarbaro Elementary School (now known as Arthur Ashe School), in Chicago. Raised by his mother Jessie, he was exposed early on to the Christian church and strong religious values.

Jimerson-Philips has three daughters.

He hold a B.A. & Ph.D from Next Dimension University, and has authored five published books, including: Prodigal Son Child of The King, Player's School' (Book of Games), and A Day in the Life....

He and Charles Allen produced a record titled "Undercover Lover" under the stage names "Captain Fantastic" and "Starr Fleet", first independently released on Right Note Records, then re-released in 2020 by Light in The Attic Records. The record was about a secret affair between a man and woman. The release featured Charles Allen, Lloyd Smith, Mark Bynum (members of The Bar-Kays) as well as bandmates Gerald Pride, Nazeeh Islam and Ralph LaVeaux. Jimerson-Philips And Allen produced other records, including the 1988 release "Playmate" by Kimmi Kim, and the 1989 release of "Undercover Lover" on the I'm Out for Love album by Revea.

He received multiple Gold and Platinum Record Awards including projects with Brandy, Ginuwine, Paula Abdul, Expose', Vanessa Williams and R. Kelly.

Jimerson-Philips has produced nine motion pictures, including Resurrection: The J.R. Richard Story, Waters Rising,
and Treasure n tha Hood (which he co-produced, starring Katt Williams).
He worked on the biopic Resurrection: The J.R. Richard Story, starring David Ramsey, Kenya Moore, Sara Stokes and Charles Durning. He was involved in other media projects, including the comedy Player’s School, the reality series The House of Divas, and the World War One film Camp Logan. He produced and directed "COGIC Pioneers Tribute", and is in development for the Prince Documentary "A Royal Loss".

Jimmerson-Phillips was commissioned as a "Goodwill Ambassador" by Arkansas Governors Jim Guy Tucker and Mike Huckabee. In early 2000 he ran for City Council in the city of Little Rock, refusing to accept donations. In 2005 he was appointed as a "Colonel" on the Staff of New Mexico Governor Bill Richardson. He traveled with and Represented Denise Matthews, also known as Vanity (Vanity 6 fame). He was recognized in a Special California State Senate Resolution #728 in 1991 & Resolution #1729 in 2006.

Education 

 The Hollywood Film Institute, Hollywood, California (2009) Certificate of Completion.
 Charles Harrison Mason University, San Diego (1993) Special Certificate from Dr. Myles Munroe &  Bishop George D. McKinney in Biblical Principles of Leadership Development.
 Chrispus Attucks School, Chicago, IL.
 University of Arkansas, Little Rock, AR.
Next Dimension University, California receiving a Th.D & Ph.D

Filmography

Discography

Books 

 Agape Coloring Activity Book of Prayers Puzzle Games (Create Space, 2012)
 Prodigal Son, Child of The King (Create Space, 2012)
 "A Day in the Life"...  (Create Space, 2012)
 'Player's School' (Book of Game) (Create Space, 2012)

Recognition 

 Special Resolution #728 from California State Senator Wadid P. Deddeh, (18 September 1991);& Special Resolution #1729 from California State Senator Denise Moreno Ducheny (8 December 2006).
 Special Resolution from CA State Senator Denise Moreno Ducheny (8 December 2006) resolution number 1729.
 Letter of Commendation from US Congresswoman Shelia Jackson Lee, (8 November 2005).
 Commission as Colonel on staff of New Mexico, State Governor Bill Richardson (19 December 2005).
 Special Proclamation from Houston, Texas, Major Lee Brown (7 April 2001).
 "Goodwill Ambassador" Commission by Arkansas State Governors Jim Guy Tucker (6 November 1993) & Mike Huckabee (18 September 1998).
 Special Proclamation from El Paso, Texas, Major Larry Francis (26 January 1996).
 Executive Order Proclaiming 6 Oct 1996 "Benjamin O. Jimerson Day" in the City of Albuquerque, NM, Mayor Martin J. Chavez.
 Executive Order 05-169, from Albuquerque NM, City Mayor Martin J. Chavez.

References

External links 
 J. O. Patterson Ministry Official Homepage
 IMDb: Benjamin O. Jimerson-Philips
 Jimerson and Associates Official Homepage
 Adept Films Inc. Official Homepage

Living people
American film producers
American male writers
American male screenwriters
Year of birth missing (living people)